Jai Singh (5 December 1653 – 23 September 1698), was the Maharana of Mewar Kingdom, ruling from 1680 to 1698. He was a son of Mahanara Raj Singh I. Jai Singh fought a series of battles against Mughal Emperor Aurangzeb. In 1680–81, he sent his noble Dayaldas in Malwa. Dayaldas occupied Dhar and Mandu. He looted those cities and fought a series of battles against Mughal army.
He married Dayawati Bai (1650–1683), a Kachhawa princess of Amber, who died in childbirth.
He built Dhebar lake also known as Jaisamand, in 1685.

On the last attack which was made by Aurangzeb with his three sons and an army of number more than 5 times than that of Maharana's, Maharana Jai Singh deployed a tactic under which he with his subjects (including villagers) took shelter under different dens after emptying all food supplies and water of well and taking it with them. When Aurangzeb attacked the villages he found nothing to be plundered, and later The Rajputs defeated the Mughals.

References 

Mewar dynasty
1653 births
1698 deaths